Vasates quadripedes, the maple bladder-gall mite, is an eriophyid mite in the genus Vasates, which causes galls on the leaves of silver maple (Acer saccharinum), red maple (A. rubrum), and sugar maple (A. saccharum). The gall is rounded, sometimes elongate, and has a short, thin neck. They have an opening in the lower surface. At first they are yellowish-green or bright red, later they become dark red and black.

In Britain, the mite affects introduced silver maple. The species is relatively new to Britain, being first recorded in London in 2002.

References

Eriophyidae
Animals described in 1869

Arachnids of Europe
Taxa named by Henry Shimer